Kyla Kennaley (also Kyla Eaglesham) is a Canadian pastry chef who appeared as a judge on The Great Canadian Baking Show.

Kennaley was raised in Ontario, where her parents operated a resort in the Kawarthas. She received a Culinary Management Diploma from Algonquin College and a bachelor's degree from the University of Ottawa. After graduation she worked as a flight attendant with Air Canada. She opened a pastry shop in Toronto in 2004 and became noted as a baking media personality, serving as "In-House Pastry Expert" on Steven and Chris. As of 2020 she lives in London and works as a Talent Development Manager at the Savoy Hotel.

References

External links

Living people
Canadian women chefs
Pastry chefs
Year of birth missing (living people)
Canadian chefs